The 2001 USC Trojans football team represented the University of Southern California in the 2001 NCAA Division I-A football season. It was Pete Carroll's first year as head coach.  The Kansas State Wildcats's victory on September 8 marked the last time a non-Pac-10 team defeated the Trojans in the Coliseum until November 27, 2010, when the Notre Dame Fighting Irish defeated the Trojans, 20–16.

Schedule
The Trojans finished the regular season with a 6–5 record.

Game summaries

San Jose State

Kansas State

Oregon

Stanford

Washington

Arizona State

Notre Dame

Arizona

Oregon State

California

UCLA

Las Vegas Bowl

Roster

Team players in the NFL
Marcell Allmond
Kevin Arbet
Chris Cash
Matt Cassel
Shaun Cody
Keary Colbert
Kori Dickerson
Justin Fargas
Lonnie Ford
Matt Grootegoed
Gregg Guenther
Alex Holmes
Norm Katnik
Kareem Kelly
David Kirtman
Jason Leach
Matt Leinart
Malaefou MacKenzie
Grant Mattos
Sultan McCullough
Ryan Nielsen
Carson Palmer
Mike Patterson
Troy Polamalu
Kris Richard
Bernard Riley
Jacob Rogers
Antuan Simmons
Kenechi Udeze
Lenny Vandermade
John Walker
Lee Webb

References

USC
USC Trojans football seasons
USC Trojans football